"Caravaggio to Canaletto" is the title of a temporary exhibition in the Museum of Fine Arts, Budapest. It's open from 26 October 2013 until 16 February 2014, representing 140 artworks by 100 masters from the Museum of Fine Arts, other collections from abroad and private collections.

The exhibition provides a panoramic view of the era from the end of the 16th century until 1760 in Italy: it treats the effect of Caravaggio on the Italian Baroque painting, and shows the way towards Roccoco, Classicism and Realism. It presents the most popular genres from the Biblical themes through still lifes to capriccios. It's composed of the following sections, generally in temporary order:

1. Face-to-face With Reality: Caravaggio's early paintings, and popular themes in Caravaggism

2. Divine Light - Diabolic Shadow: Biblical themes, life of Jesus and other saints, scenes from the Old Testament

3. Ideal and Norm: classicising ambitions by Guido Reni and his followers

4. Eloquence, Illusion, Splendour: monumental Baroque Biblical themes

5. Natura Morta - Natura Viva: new tendencies in still lifes and portraits - from trompe-l'œil to social portraiture

6. Poetry and Virtuosity in the Settecento: from the Classicism and Roccoco to "almost Biedermeier"

7. Swansong in Venice: from the most monumental religious paintings to the scenes of everyday life

8. Italian Journey: Astonishing vedutas of Venice by Canaletto and his followers, closing the exhibition with the best-known capriccio.

References

Hungarian art